Minuscule 696 (in the Gregory-Aland numbering), ε328 (von Soden), is a Greek minuscule manuscript of the New Testament, on parchment. Palaeographically it has been assigned to the 13th century. The manuscript is lacunose. Scrivener labelled it by 600e.

Description 

The codex contains the text of the four Gospels on 350 parchment leaves (size ). The text is written in two columns per page, 19-20 lines per page.

There is no division according to the Ammonian Sections and the Eusebian Canons. It contains lectionary markings, incipits,  (lessons), Synaxarion, Menologion, stichoi, and pictures. There are remarkable pictures of the Annunciation and the three later Evangelists. The Gospel headings at the left blank.

Text 

The Greek text of the codex is a representative of the Byzantine text-type. Hermann von Soden classified it to the textual family Kr. Kurt Aland placed it in Category V.

According to the Claremont Profile Method it represents textual family Kr in Luke 1 and Luke 20. In Luke 10 no profile was made.

History 

Scrivener dated the manuscript to the 14th century, Gregory dated it to the 13th or 14th century. Currently the manuscript is dated by the INTF to the 13th century.

The manuscript was bought in 1862 from H. S. Freeman, former consul in Janina.

It was added to the list of New Testament manuscript by Scrivener (600) and Gregory (696).

It was examined by S. T. Bloomfield, Dean Burgon, and William Hatch. Gregory saw the manuscript in 1883.

Currently the manuscript is housed at the British Library (Add MS 24376).

See also 

 List of New Testament minuscules
 Biblical manuscript
 Textual criticism

References

Further reading 

 S. T. Bloomfield, Critical Annotations: Additional and Supplementary on the New Testament (1860).
 W. H. P. Hatch, Facsimiles and descriptions of minuscule manuscripts of the New Testament, LXI (Cambridge, 1951).

Greek New Testament minuscules
13th-century biblical manuscripts
British Library additional manuscripts